Harold Trevor Baker  (22 January 1877 – 12 July 1960) was a British scholar and Liberal politician.

Background
Baker was born on Portsea Island, the son of Louisa and Sir John Baker, MP for Portsmouth. He was educated at Winchester College and New College, Oxford. He received the Gaisford Prize in 1899. He was also a Craven Scholar, Hertford Scholar and an Eldon Scholar. He was President of the Oxford Union from 1900 to 1901. He was unmarried. In 1933 he was Fellow of Winchester College and Warden from 1936 to 1946.

Professional career
Baker was Called to Bar by the Inner Temple in 1903. He was Secretary to the Royal Commission on War Stores in South Africa. He was  a Member of His Majesty's Army Council, European War, 1914 and  Inspector of Quartermaster-General Services in 1916.

Political career

Baker was elected to the House of Commons for Accrington in the January 1910 general election. He served in the Liberal administration of H. H. Asquith as Financial Secretary to the War Office from 1912 to 1914 and was admitted to the Privy Council in 1915. He was one of the few Liberal MPs of this period who opposed granting the vote to women. He was defeated at the 1918 general election when he faced both a Labour opponent as well as a Coalition government backed Unionist. He tried to win his seat back in 1922 but finished third. He did not stand for parliament again.

Electoral record

Baker died in Winchester in July 1960, aged 83.

References

External links
 
 

1877 births
1960 deaths
Liberal Party (UK) MPs for English constituencies
Members of the Privy Council of the United Kingdom
UK MPs 1910
UK MPs 1910–1918
Presidents of the Oxford Union
Alumni of New College, Oxford
Members of the Inner Temple
People educated at Winchester College
Members of the Parliament of the United Kingdom for constituencies in Lancashire